Bernardo Baras is an Argentine actor who  has appeared in films and TV in Argentina since 1982.

He has acted in films such as the 1988 Victor Dinenzon film, Abierto de 18 a 24 alongside actors Gerardo Romano and Horacio Peña.

His last appearance was in 2004.

References

External links
 

Year of birth missing (living people)
Argentine male film actors
Living people
Place of birth missing (living people)
20th-century Argentine male actors
21st-century Argentine male actors